Namish Taneja is an Indian television actor known for portraying Lakshya Maheshwari in Swaragini - Jodein Rishton Ke Sur.

Television

Music videos

Awards

References

External links

 
 

Living people
Male actors from Mumbai
Indian male soap opera actors
Year of birth missing (living people)